Thorne's meadow nematode (Thorne's root-lesion nematode; Pratylenchus thornei) is a plant pathogenic nematode.

Hosts 
Hosts include Aegilops geniculata (ovate goatgrass) and Triticum aestivum (cultivated wheat).

Aegilops geniculata enjoys moderate resistance to this nematode. Ae. geniculata is thus used as a wild source of resistance for introgression into cultivated wheat.

References

External links 
 Pratylenchus thornei  Nemaplex, University of California

thornei
Plant pathogenic nematodes
Nematodes described in 1953